Gaumont Television (sometimes written as GIT or GITV) is the American television division of the French Gaumont. It was launched on September 12, 2011 as an independent studio based in Los Angeles, designed to produce drama and comedy television programming for the U.S. and international markets.

Productions 
Hemlock Grove on Netflix
Narcos on Netflix
Hannibal on NBC
Madame Tussaud
James Patterson’s Bennett on ABC
Radiant Doors on WGN America
F Is for Family on Netflix.

Developing productions
Barbarella
Viva La Madness

References

External links
 Gaumont Television website

Television production companies of the United States
Entertainment companies based in California
Companies based in Los Angeles
American companies established in 2011
Entertainment companies established in 2011
Mass media companies established in 2011
2011 establishments in California
Gaumont Film Company
American subsidiaries of foreign companies